ARETI International Group of Companies is a private energy company headquartered in Geneva, Switzerland. ARETI was created by Igor Makarov in 2015 following his sale of Itera International Group of Companies, which was started in 1992 and sold off in 2013. The ARETI group company consists of holding companies registered in Cyprus, Virgin Islands, and the Netherlands and has subsidiaries involved in the energy industry, civil and industrial engineering, and finance. The company operates primarily in Switzerland and the Commonwealth of Independent States (CIS) countries.  In 2013, its main subsidiary, Itera Oil & Gas Company, was acquired by Rosneft prior to any sanctions placed on Rosneft.

History
A firm which later became a part of the Itera Group was established in 1992 as a basic commodities trading company. Established in 1992, the Itera International Energy Corporation headquarters in Jacksonville, Florida kept Makarov's wealth beyond the political and financial turmoil of Russia and the former Soviet states. In 1997, Itera Energy Corporation came under offshore ownership through four firms the Virgin Islands-based Lemar Industries, the Nicosia, Cyprus-based Paltron Trading Ltd, Omrania Trading Ltd., and Unirakon Trading Ltd. which controlled the Curaçao-based Itera Holding NV which controls the Netherlands-based Itera Holding B V. Makarov's Itera is associated to Itera Group through Omrania.

In 1994, it obtained the rights to sell Turkmeni natural gas as payment for its sugar transaction and started implementing gas-related projects within its subsidiary Itera Oil & Gas Company, LLC. In 1995, Itera began selling Turkmeni gas to Ukraine, Belarus, Moldova, and Georgia, as well as to the Baltic States over Gazprom pipelines in exchange for hard cash, sugar, meat, and cereals to Russia.

Registered in Wilmington, Delaware in May 1996, Itera International Energy LLS governed gas supplies and financial statements.

Registered in Riga, Latvia in November 1996, ITERA Latvia or ITERA Latvija, which was headed by Juris Savitskis, governed gas supplies, pipelines and underground storage in Latvia and Estonia where it held a large stakes in both the Latvian gas company Latvijas Gaas or Latvijas Gāze and the Estonian gas company Eesti Gaas. Mr. Makarov exited the investment in 2013 when Itera Oil & Gas Company was sold off and has no relationship to ITERA Latvija since.

In 1998, Itera launched production of natural gas in Yamalo-Nenets Autonomous Okrug in Western Siberia.

Due to enormous reserves, Makarov's Itera was the fourth largest natural gas company in the world in 2000.

In 2002, there was an agreement to merge the newly created gas company Novatek with Itera, but the deal was cancelled.

After the 5 December 2002 establishment of Eural Trans Gas, Itera was no longer the dominant natural gas provider to Ukraine.

In 2010, India-based Sun Group sold its 26% stake in Itera Holdings back to Itera Group. In 2011, TNK-BP planned to acquire a 50% stake in Itera. This transaction failed. In 2012, Rosneft announced a plan to acquire up to 51% in Itera Oil & Gas. In 2013, Rosneft acquired the remaining 49% in Itera Oil & Gas. Following the complete sale of Itera Oil & Gas, Makarov was subject to a non-compete clause in the Russian energy sector.

By mid-2015, Makarov had restructured and reenergized his remaining companies to enter a new stage of development. The Group's remaining structures were rebranded as the ARETI International Group (ARETI IG) to signal a new direction. Today, ARETI IG is composed of subsidiaries and affiliated companies with business interests in the United States, Canada, Turkmenistan, Western Europe and in the Middle East. ARETI IG has offices located in Switzerland (Geneva), Cyprus (Limassol), Turkmenistan (Ashgabat), Canada (Calgary) and the United States (Jacksonville).

Operations

Itera Oil & Gas Company
The main subsidiary of Itera was Itera Oil & Gas Company. It had 49% stake in Sibneftegaz (another shareholder is Novatek), which holds licences for exploration and production in the Yamal-Nenets region, including the Beregovoye field, Pyreinoye field, Zapadno-Zapolyarnoye field, and the Khadyryakhinskiy licence area.

In Sverdlovsk Oblast, the company operated through ZAO Uralsevergaz, a joint venture with the oblast administration. Together with Zarubezhneft, Itera carried out a development of block 21 in the Turkmen sector of the Caspian Sea. Together with Zarubezhneft and Rosneft, it developed blocks 29, 30 and 31.

Other activities
Since the mid-2000s, Itera group was involved in civil and industrial engineering in Russia, Belarus and Turkmenistan. Among the projects were an office complex for the 2014 Winter Olympic Games in Sochi, Russia, a skyscraper and a business center in Minsk, and sport facilities and pipelines in Turkmenistan and Russia. The company had commenced construction of a steam-gas power cogeneration plant with a capacity of 900 MW in the Nizhny Novgorod Region and for construction of a gas and petrochemical complex in the Urals with a capacity of 600,000 tons of methanol per year. In 2009, Itera's subsidiary MPK Engineering was contracted to build the  Central Kara Kum–CS Yilanly gas pipeline in Turkmenistan.  The pipeline was completed in 2010.

Since 2008, Itera, through its subsidiary Arkticheskiye razrabotki, developed Apsatskoe mineral coal mine, one of the largest in Russia, in Zabaykalsky Krai. Through its 72% stake in Stavropolstroynerud, it developed the Malkinsky quarry, located in Stavropol Region, with production capacity exceeding 1 million cubic meters of crushed stone, sand, and gravel per year. In 2011 100% of Arkticheskiye razrabotki were sold to SUEK, which became the new owner of Apsatskoe.

In the United States, Itera focused on oil and real estate, in addition to renewable energy sources, chemicals and bioenergy technologies. In 2008, Itera put a bioethanol refinery into operation in Pennsylvania.  The construction of a similar facility in Louisiana was planned, as well.

Corporate affairs

Structure
Itera Group Ltd. was registered in Cyprus.  It owned Itera Holdings Limited, also registered in Cyprus, which owned 99.99% of Itera Oil and Gas Company, the main company of the group. In 2012 51% of Itera Oil & Gas were included into a joint-venture with Russian state-owned oil company Rosneft, which in 2013 also bought out remaining 49% from Itera Holdings Limited Altogether, Itera Group has dozens of subsidiaries in Russia, CIS, Asia, Europe and in the US. Its main shareholder, chairman of the board of directors and president is Igor Makarov.

Financials
In 2010, Itera had a gross profit of US$435.9 million and a net profit under IAS of US$226.9 million.  Net sales amounted to US$1.6 billion, compared to US$1.15 billion in the previous year, and natural gas sales were RUR1.58 billion, compared to RUR1.13 billion in the previous year.

Sponsorships
Itera was a sponsor of the European Cycling Union (UEC).  In March 2011, the UEC President Wojciech Walkiewicz and Igor Makarov, the chairman of the board of directors for Itera, signed a contract for financial support until the end of 2011, with the possibility of contract renewal.

In Russia, Itera was a long-term primary sponsor of the Russian Cycling Federation and it is one of the three key sponsors (along with Gazprom and Rostechnologii) of Russian cycling teams Katusha ProTour and Itera–Katusha continental, and two youth cycling teams, Itera–Katusha Under 21 and Itera–Katusha Under 23. With financial support from the Israeli–Canadian billionaire Sylvan Adams, the Makarov backed Swiss-based Katusha–Alpecin was taken over by the Israel Cycling Academy including its World Tour license in October 2019. From 2009 until October 2019, Makarov's ITERA had been a sponsor of Team Katyusha.

Itera signed an agreement with Gubkin Russian State University of Oil and Gas. According to the agreement, Itera provided grants to the best-performing students. The company also financed a number of scientific projects, and assists in providing technical equipment for the curricula.

Itera was one of the trustees of the Saint Petersburg Mining Institute, providing assistance in developing its educational and scientific base, preserving and renewing a group of historical buildings, repairing and constructing student dormitories and introducing innovative programs and technologies. Itera provided financial backing for constructing the Skolkovo Moscow School of Management.

Controversies
According to Bloomberg BusinessWeek, in the late 1990s, the Russian state-controlled company Gazprom conducted dubious transactions with Itera and a Gazprom/Itera joint-venture, Purgaz. Billions of dollars of Russian natural gas resources were transferred from Gazprom to Itera for artificially low prices, then sold to the markets by Itera, allegedly profiting Gazprom managers who were also beneficiaries of Itera. In 2002, Bill Browder, manager of the Hermitage Capital Management investment fund, accused Itera and Gazprom of colluding to depress natural gas prices and also stock prices in a scheme that PricewaterhouseCoopers (PwC), which had been the in house auditor for Gazprom since 1996, could not uncover after PwC had produced dangerously lax audits of Gazprom. In February 2002, Boris Fyodorov, as an independent director of Gazprom, stated that PricewaterhouseCoopers (PwC) signed off on poorly performed audits of natural gas firm interactions such as Gazprom-Itera because PwC wanted to keep the account with Gazprom adding "If an auditor knows it cannot do a proper review, then it is just doing it for the money." Further, he said that any audits by Deloitte & Touche into the Gazprom-Itera interactions were strongly opposed by Gazprom management. Despite the allegations, PricewaterhouseCoopers (PwC) defended the audit reports and the Moscow Arbitration Court threw out all five suits filled by Bill Browder against Gazprom in June 2002. "A Moscow Arbitration Court judge has thrown out five lawsuits that minority shareholder activist William Browder filed against Big Four auditing firm PricewaterhouseCoopers. We hope we’re at the end of it, these decisions are pretty definitive." said PwC managing partner Richard Buski.

In March 2002, the U.S. Trade and Development Agency cancelled a $868,000 grant to Itera as questions were raised about its legitimacy. In May, Representative Curt Weldon led a congressional delegation to Russia and visited Itera. After his return, he publicly supported Itera's efforts. In the beginning of September 2002, Itera paid the expenses for Weldon to travel to New York City. The following week, Itera told Karen Weldon, the congressman's daughter, that it would sign a public relations contract for $500,000-a-year with her newly formed lobbying firm, Solutions North America, Inc. (SNA) which was signed on 30 September 2002. On 24 September 2002, Curt Weldon co-hosted an event at the Library of Congress honoring Itera's chairman. On 26 September, Weldon gave a floor speech praising Itera. On 30 September, SNA received a $500,000 annual contract with Itera, with $170,000 up front.  In November 2002, Itera paid for Karen Weldon to join Rep. Weldon on a trip to Eastern Europe and Russia. In January 2003, Itera opened its newly expanded U.S. offices at Jacksonville, Florida, and paid for Rep. Weldon to attend the opening. Investigations have found no wrongdoing by Itera or any of its associates.

Notes

References

Sources

External links
 

Natural gas companies of Russia
Companies based in Moscow
Rosneft
1992 establishments in Russia
Privately held companies of Russia